Banbury Reservoir is located in the London Borough of Waltham Forest at Walthamstow. It is one of the storage reservoirs  in the Lee Valley Reservoir Chain. The reservoir is owned by Thames Water.

History
The reservoir, which was completed in 1903, was originally owned by the East London Waterworks Company, before being taken over by the newly formed Metropolitan Water Board in 1904.

See also
London water supply infrastructure

References 

Drinking water reservoirs in England
Thames Water reservoirs
Reservoirs in London